Mildred Gail Pabón Charneco (born November 27, 1957 in San Juan, Puerto Rico) is a Puerto Rican jurist serving as an associate justice of the Supreme Court of Puerto Rico after being appointed to the post on February 4, 2009 by Governor Luis Fortuño. In 1983 she earned her juris doctor from the University of Puerto Rico School of Law. She filled the vacancy created by the death of Associate Justice Jaime Fuster in 2007.  Justice Pabón is the fourth woman to serve on the Puerto Rican High Court.

Prior to serving as associate justice, Pabón served for over nine years as a judge at the Puerto Rico Circuit Court of Appeals and as Legislative Counsel to Governor Pedro Rosselló. Prior to that, Pabón  worked as a staff attorney at the Office of Legislative Services of Puerto Rico and in private practice.

See also 
List of Hispanic/Latino American jurists

References
 Supreme Court Website, in Spanish

1957 births
Living people
Associate Justices of the Supreme Court of Puerto Rico
Hispanic and Latino American judges
Puerto Rican judges